Polystira parvula is a species of sea snail, a marine gastropod mollusk in the family Turridae, the turrids.

Description
The length of the shell attains 14.7 mm.

Distribution
This marine species occurs off Martinique.

References

External links
 Espinosa J., Ortea J. & Moro L. (2017). Seis nuevas especies caribeñas del género Polystira Woodring, 1928 (Mollusca: Neogastropoda: Turridae). Avicennia. 20: 35-40.

parvula
Gastropods described in 2017